Patricio Alvarado (born 6 October 1989) is an Ecuadorian tennis player.

Alvarado has a career high ATP singles ranking of 872 achieved on 8 September 2008. He also has a career high ATP doubles ranking of 665 achieved on 12 November 2007.

Alvarado represents Ecuador at the Davis Cup, where he has a W/L record of 0–1.

References

External links

1989 births
Living people
Ecuadorian male tennis players
People from Manta, Ecuador
21st-century Ecuadorian people